Caryocolum iranicum is a moth of the family Gelechiidae. It is found in Turkey (Anatolia) and western Iran.

References

Moths described in 1989
iranicum
Moths of Asia